Vice Admiral Sir Charles Anthony Johnstone-Burt,  (born 1 February 1958) is a retired Royal Navy officer who is currently serving as the Master of the Household.

Education
Johnstone-Burt was educated at Wellington College and Van Mildert College at Durham University, where he took Joint Honours in Psychology and Anthropology in 1980.

Naval career
Johnstone-Burt joined the Royal Navy in 1977. Promoted to lieutenant in January 1982, served in  during the Falklands War. He qualified as a helicopter pilot in 1983 flying Sea Kings and Lynx helicopters. He also attended the Higher Command and Staff Course at the Joint Services Command and Staff College in 2000.

He went on to be Deputy Commander and Chief of Staff of the Joint Helicopter Command in 2005, Flag Officer, Scotland, Northern England and Northern Ireland in 2006, and Commander of the Joint Helicopter Command in 2008 before being appointed Director of Counter Narcotics and International Organised Crime at Headquarters International Security Assistance Force in Kabul, Afghanistan in 2011. Promoted to vice admiral, he became the Chief of Staff to NATO's Supreme Allied Command Transformation at Norfolk, Virginia, in November 2011 and held this post until October 2013 when he retired from the Service.

Johnstone-Burt was appointed a Companion of the Order of the Bath (CB) in the 2013 New Year Honours, and Knight Commander of the Royal Victorian Order (KCVO) in the 2020 Birthday Honours.

In 2013 Johnstone-Burt became the Master of the Household to the Sovereign.  He was a member of the Board of Governors of Monkton Combe School from 2004.  He was appointed as a Deputy Lieutenant of the County of Dorset on 22 August 2016. This gave him the Post Nominal Letters "DL" for Life.

References

|-

|-

1958 births
Living people
People educated at Wellington College, Berkshire
Alumni of Van Mildert College, Durham
Royal Navy vice admirals
Companions of the Order of the Bath
Deputy Lieutenants of Dorset
Governors of Monkton Combe School
Knights Commander of the Royal Victorian Order
Officers of the Order of the British Empire
Royal Navy personnel of the Falklands War
Royal Navy personnel of the War in Afghanistan (2001–2021)
Naval War College alumni
Masters of the Household